The Innovia APM 200 was an automated people mover system (APM) manufactured and marketed by Bombardier Transportation (later Alstom). It was second generation of Innovia APM offered and is part of Alstom's Innovia series of fully automated transportation systems.

The Innovia APM 200 was the successor to the Innovia APM 100 and was succeeded by Innovia APM 300. Designed in response to the growing popularity of the Crystal Mover, the advancements the Innovia APM 200 made over the Innovia APM 100 included a new aerodynamic design, allowing for greater speeds and tighter turns. The Innovia APM 200 also featured full composite construction, and multiple end cap options.

Specifications 
If there is enough room two wheelchairs can fit in each Innovia APM 200 car, in addition to sitting and standing room. A maximum of four cars can be coupled together in a single train. Each car is air-conditioned, lit, and includes tinted windows attached to the composite shell body.

Implementations 

 DFW Skylink (2005) – , 10 stations, 64 vehicles
 Heathrow Terminal 5 Transit (2008) – airside system, 3 stations, 10 vehicles
 PHX Sky Train (2013) – Built in three phases. Phase 1 opened April 2013, connecting the Valley Metro Rail station to the East Economy Parking Garage and Terminal 4. Phase 1A opened December 2013 extending the line to Terminal 3, with a covered walkway to Terminal 2. Phase 2 extended the line to the Rental Car Center, and opened in 2022.

References

External links 

 Bombardier Transportation – Dallas-Fort Worth International Airport
 Bombardier Transportation – London Heathrow Airport

Bombardier Transportation people movers
Innovia APM 200
Bombardier Transportation multiple units
Electric multiple units of the United States
Electric multiple units of Great Britain